"Yes, Then Zero" is the 88th episode of the CW television series, Gossip Girl, as well as the first episode of the show's fifth season. The episode was written by executive producer Joshua Safran and directed by Mark Piznarski. It aired on Monday, September 26, 2011 on the CW.

"Yes, Then Zero" opens the fifth season with most of the cast settled in Los Angeles for the summer. Serena van der Woodsen (Blake Lively) has found a job working for a production company but finds herself at odds with a co-worker. Chuck Bass (Ed Westwick) and Nate Archibald (Chace Crawford) spend the summer together as Chuck adopts a new philosophy that could potentially endanger him while the mysterious Diana Payne (Elizabeth Hurley) takes an interest in Nate. Dan Humphrey (Penn Badgley) asks a favor from an engaged Prince Louis (Hugo Becker) to keep his work from getting published. Blair Waldorf (Leighton Meester) faces tension from Louis' mother regarding the wedding preparations and her relationship with Louis. Ivy Dickens (Kaylee DeFer) is forced to reprise her role as Charlie Rhodes when she runs into Serena in Los Angeles.

Plot
  
Serena's working on the movie adaptation of The Beautiful and the Damned, but her supervisor Marshall is not exactly the nicest of characters. Still, she's got her invitation to Blair and Louis' wedding on November 26.

Elsewhere, Dan's playing softball in the Hamptons when Rufus shows up, helpfully telling us that Jenny is now in London attending St Martins.

Dan also gets his wedding invite - but he's perhaps not as thrilled as Serena. There's even more for him to worry about when he discovers that an extract of his book is about to run in Vanity Fair!

Then it's back to Los Angeles, where Chuck and Nate are living in luxury on a yacht (with plenty of women around, naturally). Nate's the one who gets the wedding invitations, but he hides Chuck's, of course. Serena shows up to welcome them to LA, and is impressed with how gosh darn happy Chuck seems. It turns out that he has decided to say "yes" to every opportunity that presents itself.

When he discovers that Serena was asked by a producer called Jane to write up some thoughts on a scene but she didn't do it because of Marshall, he tells her it's not too late. Serena agrees to go through with it and Nate and Chuck go with her to the set to see it through.

The trio get to set and Chuck immediately goes off with one of the employees while Nate is shocked to hear that Serena has arranged an audition for him.

Meanwhile, Serena goes to see Jane, who isn't entirely impressed that Serena never followed up on their last meeting. Still, she likes Serena and suggests giving her more responsibility to see how she does.

Naturally, Marshall is not so happy about this and gives Serena a huge list of things to do. Serena promises to get them done by the party that night - then Chuck falls out of a window onto a big cushion. The woman he was with tells him he'll be in trouble, and then agrees to go on a date with him.

Anyway, Nate helps Serena complete her list - including obtaining some medicinal marijuana for the film's director Patrick. As they walk and talk, Nate goes all introspective about how he's had a tough time and needs to find himself. Serena is less impatient and advises him to reinvent himself while he's in Hollywood.

What better time than at a party? Serena and Nate arrive, while Chuck decides to ride his motorcycle with his date he met on set. He and his date were supposed to go with another girl, Marylou, but she has to be with Patrick because if he doesn't stay sober the film loses its money.

Chuck and his date begin riding along the winding roads round LA, and she warns him to be careful. But Chuck says he's not scared of anything, and then promptly skids and falls off his bike. His date is rather unimpressed, saying she thinks something dark is going on and he needs help. And then she ends the date. Poor Chuck.

At the party, Serena's showing off about finishing all the items on the list. When she hands it back to Marshall, though, he deletes the instruction to get the weed. Cheeky, cheeky! Serena naturally goes over to Patrick to hand him the marijuana, which makes him very happy indeed.

The only problem is that Serena later sees Marshall and Marylou chatting urgently. When she goes over, she discovers that Marshall "found" the marijuana and "confiscated" it. Ooh, boo hiss. She's furious with Marshall, but he explains that he needs this job more than she does - he has to pay for stuff and he can't get another as easily as her.

Plus, this is his career and Serena will have forgotten about it by next summer. As annoying as Marshall is, he kind of has a point. Anyway, Serena decides to tell Marylou that she was responsible as someone played a prank on her and tells Marshall to inform Jane she'll clear out her desk in the morning.

Nate's having a better time at the party. Following Chuck's advice to say "yes" to everything, he pretends that he's the owner of the house and ends up doing naughty things to none other than Elizabeth Hurley in one of the bedrooms. She does, however, reveal that she is the real owner of the house.

The next day, after all that drama, Chuck goes all deep and wise and proves that Serena and Nate have both learnt things from their escapades. Oh, and he says he's totally fine about the Blair wedding invitation and Nate doesn't need to protect him. After a couple of hugs, Nate goes to pick up his phone from Diana's house, while Serena goes to clear her desk.

Turns out that Diana's hiding something. Just before Nate turns up, she's on the phone to someone saying that she wasn't expecting to make contact with him so soon and she'll see him again sooner than imagined. Still, when Nate turns up, she doesn't exactly keep him hanging about, issuing a quick goodbye.

It's better news for Serena, who naturally ends up being hired by Jane, who's impressed with her "dedication and fire". Chuck and Nate are thrilled by the news and pop open a bottle of champagne, which Serena agrees to drink - so she's not preggers! The booze flows everywhere, though, and Chuck goes to clean his shirt. As he lifts it up, we see he's sporting a massive bruise. Oh dear.

Let's head back to New York, though - Blair and Louis are back from their holiday in Monaco and have to get down to some serious wedding planning. It's not easy, though - Eleanor's moaning like nobody's business and Blair's not getting her way for once.

The final straw is when Blair discovers that she will be photographed in her wedding dress for Vogue Paris - but will be wearing Sophie's dress. She doesn't even get to pick her own. Dorota suggests that Blair should drink some prosecco, but Blair turns it down - maybe she's the pregnant one? Gossip Girl wants to know who it is, anyway, but Dorota sneakily deletes the message.

After a quick moan to Serena on the phone, Blair is preoccupied and ignores Dorota, who's hoping to talk. When Louis arrives, he admits that he hasn't been able to rationalise with his mother because he's worried she'll cause problems later. However, to prove he's going to be there for Blair, he invites her to a gala at the UN - which is kind of breaking the rules as Blair's not married into the family yet.

Elsewhere, Dan is desperately trying to stop the extract from his book getting published - turns out it's all about Blair. He decides to enlist Louis to help him. Louis is reluctant as he's late for picking up Blair, but when Dan says the story is about Blair and Louis won't be happy if it's published, he agrees.

Of course, this means he has to call Blair and cancel. She is naturally furious and hangs up, saying Sophie has won. Then she takes a cab to Dan's loft and admits she didn't know where else to go. She reveals that she's going to call off her engagement and will need to clear her head afterwards. Dan - who's still clearly fallen for her - agrees to take her to the Hamptons and grabs his keys in the blink of an eye.

Unfortunately, Louis arrives at that point and explains what's been going on - he's been helping Dan stop the extract about Blair being published. Dan confirms that Louis was protecting Blair, and she's now furious with him instead. She is incensed that he would let her walk away from Louis when he knew what was really going on. She asks what possible reason he could have, but Dan can't quite spit out: "I love you." Maybe later...

Rufus ends up reading the extract and praises it, though he doesn't know why Dan was so worried about it since Blair comes out of it all pretty well. He assumed the ending was artistic licence, though - I'm guessing that was the whole kissing bit. Anyway, Dan's just hoping that the rest of the book will remain under wraps. Dream on, Dan - you're about to get a cheque for $10,000 from a certain Vanessa with the message: "Congratulations on your first novel."

Anyway, all is going well with Louis and Blair again and she's getting ready for the photo shoot when Eleanor turns up holding a copy of What To Expect When You're Expecting. It turns out that it belongs to Dorota, who's pregnant again.

Blair ends up going down to get into Sophie's wedding dress ready for the shoot. Louis turns up and switches the flowers picked out by Sophie for Blair's choice and everyone's smiling. But wait - this pesky tailor thinks Blair's pregnant. Her measurements have changed and she thinks Blair's about six weeks. Blair denies it, but the designer says everyone will know the truth by the time of the wedding. It would be the most manipulative, beautiful creature in the world. Especially if Chuck's the father... who's the father?

That's not all though - turns out Charlie/Ivy has moved to Los Angeles and is working in a restaurant with her boyfriend. Of course, this just happens to be the restaurant that Serena pops into. Charlie/Ivy is naturally shocked but pretends she's not a waitress and walks out with Serena.

Production
Blair (Leighton Meester) wore an Oscar de la Renta dress, while Serena (Blake Lively) wore a Catherine Malandrino dress. Diana Payne (Elizabeth Hurley) wore dresses designed by Dolce & Gabbana and Herve Leger.

Casting
American musicians, Jenny Lewis and Johnathan Rice made a cameo portraying themselves throughout the episode.

Music
The song "Kinda Outta Luck" by Lana Del Rey is used in promo video from episode. The episode features the single "My Pet Snake" from the first studio album of Jenny and Johnny, entitled I'm Having Fun Now. It also features song Bad Karma by "Ida Maria"

Reception
The Wrong Goodbye received mixed reviews and was watched by 1.37 million viewers. TV Fanatic gave the episode positive reviews opening the show's return to creative form. "The question heading into Season Five of Gossip Girl is whether the show will return to what made it great - humor, heart and a healthy dose of scandal - or continue on the path last season went down, with convoluted, over-the-top stories and, worse yet, our beloved characters not even acting like themselves. So, did tonight offer fans reason for hope? Yes is most definitely the word. Between the pregnancy reveal - so surprising I really didn't think Gossip Girl of all shows would go there - the tie-in with Daniel's novel, Nate's latest liaison and Chuck channeling his inner James Dean, "Yes, Then Zero" was a resounding success. We can only hope future episodes build on this and don't fizzle out."
 
http://www.tvfanatic.com/2011/09/gossip-girl-review-yes-then-zero/

References

External links
 

Gossip Girl (season 5) episodes
2011 American television episodes